The Steel Trail is a 1923 American drama film serial directed by and starring William Duncan.

Cast

Chapter titles

 Intrigue
 Dynamite
 Wildfire
 Blown from the Cliff
 Head On
 Crushed
 The Gold Rush
 Judith's Peril
 The Dam Bursts
 The Trap
 The Fight on the Cliff
 The Tottering Bridge
 Between Two Fires
 Burning Fumes
 Ten Seconds to Go

See also
 List of film serials
 List of film serials by studio

References

External links

1923 films
American silent serial films
American black-and-white films
1923 drama films
Universal Pictures film serials
Silent American drama films
Films with screenplays by George H. Plympton
Films directed by William Duncan
1920s American films